Op-die-Berg is a settlement in Cape Winelands District Municipality in the Western Cape province of South Africa. It is located north of Ceres in the Kouebokkeveld region, synonymous with cherry orchards and occasional heavy snowfalls in winter.

References

Populated places in the Witzenberg Local Municipality